George Reeves (born George Keefer Brewer; January 5, 1914 – June 16, 1959) was an American actor. He is best known for portraying Superman in the television series Adventures of Superman (1952–1958).

His death at age 45 from a gunshot remains controversial. The official finding was suicide, but some believe that he was murdered or the victim of an accidental shooting.

Early life
Reeves was born January 5, 1914, as George Keefer Brewer in Woolstock, Iowa, the son of Donald Carl Brewer and Helen Lescher. Reeves was born five months into their marriage and the couple separated soon after Reeves's birth. At this time, Reeves and his mother moved from Iowa to Ashland, Kentucky, to stay with relatives for a time and then to her home of Galesburg, Illinois.

Later, Reeves's mother, who was of German descent, moved to California to stay with her sister. There she had met and married Frank Joseph Bessolo by 1927, according to that year's federal census. Reeves's father married Helen Schultz in 1925. Reeves reportedly never saw his father again. In 1927, Frank Bessolo adopted George at aged 13, as his own son, and the boy took on his stepfather's last name, becoming George Bessolo. The Bessolo marriage lasted 15 years, ending in divorce, with the couple separating while Reeves was away visiting relatives. When he returned, his mother told him his stepfather had committed suicide. According to biographer Jim Beaver, Reeves did not know for several years that Bessolo was still alive. Bessolo actually died March 4, 1944, at age 51, when his adopted son was well into his movie career.

Reeves began acting and singing in high school and continued performing on stage as a student at Pasadena Junior College.

Acting career
While studying acting at the Pasadena Playhouse, Reeves met his future wife, Ellanora Needles, granddaughter of circus magnate John Robinson. They married on September 22, 1940, in San Gabriel, California, at the Church of Our Savior. They had no children and divorced 10 years later.

Reeves's film career began in 1939 when he was cast as Stuart Tarleton (incorrectly listed in the film's credits as Brent Tarleton), one of Scarlett O'Hara's suitors in Gone with the Wind. It was a minor role, but he and Fred Crane were in the film's opening scene. (Reeves and Crane both dyed their hair red to portray the Tarleton twins.) After Gone with the Wind was filmed, Reeves returned to the Pasadena Playhouse and was given the lead role in the play Pancho. This part directly led to his being contracted to Warner Brothers. Warner changed his professional name to George Reeves. His Gone with the Wind screen credit reflects the change. Between the start of production on Gone With the Wind and its release 12 months later, several films on his Warner contract were made and released, making Gone With the Wind his first film role, but his fifth film release.

He starred in a number of two-reel short subjects and appeared in several B-pictures, including two with future president of the United States Ronald Reagan and three with James Cagney (Torrid Zone, The Fighting 69th, and The Strawberry Blonde). These roles did little to advance Reeves's career, and his contract with Warners was dissolved by mutual consent.

Released from his Warner contract, he signed a contract at Twentieth Century-Fox but was released after only a handful of films, one of which was the Charlie Chan movie Dead Men Tell. Twentieth Century-Fox loaned him to producer Alexander Korda to co-star with Merle Oberon in Lydia, a box-office failure, after which he freelanced, looking to find work in westerns. His friend Teddi Sherman introduced him to her father, producer Harry Sherman, who asked Reeves to do a screen test with Teddi for the Hopalong Cassidy films. Reeves and Sherman impressed the casting director by performing seven pages of script in a single take without pause. Reeves appeared in five Hopalong Cassidy westerns before being cast as Lieutenant John Summers opposite Claudette Colbert in So Proudly We Hail! (1942), a war drama for Paramount Pictures, which signed Reeves up for two films a year.

However, Reeves was inspired by So Proudly We Hail! to put his budding acting career on hold and enlist in the U.S. Army. He was drafted in early 1943. He was assigned to the U.S. Army Air Forces and performed in the USAAF's Broadway show Winged Victory. The long Broadway run was followed by a national tour and a movie version. Reeves was then transferred to the Army Air Forces' First Motion Picture Unit, where he made training films.

Discharged at the war's end, Reeves returned to Hollywood. Many studios were slowing down their production schedules, however, and some production units had shut down completely. He appeared in a pair of outdoor thrillers with Ralph Byrd. As more and more time passed between acting jobs paying less and less, Reeves was reduced to appearing in a low-budget serial produced by Sam Katzman, The Adventures of Sir Galahad, and taking a second job digging cesspools. Reeves fit the rugged requirements of the roles, and, with his retentive memory for dialogue, he did well under rushed production conditions. He was able to play against type and starred as a villainous gold hunter in a Johnny Weissmuller Jungle Jim film. Separated from his wife (their divorce became final in 1950), Reeves moved to New York City in 1949. He performed on live television anthology programs, as well as on radio, and then returned to Hollywood in 1951 for a role in a Fritz Lang film, Rancho Notorious.

In 1953, Reeves played a minor character, Sergeant Maylon Stark, in From Here to Eternity. The film won the Academy Award for Best Picture and gave Reeves the distinction of appearing in two "Best Picture" films.

Superman
In June 1951, Reeves was offered the role of Superman in a new television series titled Adventures of Superman. He was initially reluctant to take the role because, like many actors of his time, he considered television unimportant and believed few would see his work. The half-hour films were shot on tight schedules; at least two shows were made every six days. According to commentaries on the Adventures of Superman DVD sets, multiple scripts were filmed simultaneously to take advantage of the standing sets; for example, all the "Perry White's office" scenes for three or four episodes would be shot the same day and the various "apartment" scenes would be done consecutively.

Reeves's career as Superman had begun with Superman and the Mole Men, a film intended both as a B-picture and as the pilot for the TV series. Immediately after completing it, Reeves and the crew began production of the first season's episodes, all shot over 13 weeks in the summer of 1951. The series went on the air the following year, and Reeves was amazed at becoming a national celebrity. In 1952, the struggling ABC Network purchased the show for national broadcast, which gave him greater visibility.

The Superman cast members had restrictive contracts preventing them from taking other work that might interfere with the series. Except for the second season, the Superman schedule was brief (13 shows shot two per week, a total of seven weeks out of a year), but all had a "30-day clause", which meant that the producers could demand their exclusive services for a new season on four weeks' notice. This prevented long-term work on major films with long schedules, stage plays that might lead to a lengthy run, or any other series work.

Reeves, however, earned additional income from personal appearances. He had affection for his young fans, and took his role-model status seriously. He avoided smoking cigarettes where children could see him and eventually quit smoking. He kept his private life discreet, including a romantic relationship with Toni Mannix, wife of Metro-Goldwyn-Mayer general manager Eddie Mannix.

In the documentary Look, Up in the Sky: The Amazing Story of Superman, Jack Larson said that when he first met Reeves, he told him that he enjoyed his performance in So Proudly We Hail! According to Larson, Reeves said that if Mark Sandrich had not died, he would not be there in "this monkey suit". According to Larson, Reeves also said he would feel better about the role if he knew he had any adult fans but never learned that Adventures of Superman had adult fans even during its original broadcast run.

Between the first and second seasons of Superman, Reeves got sporadic acting assignments in one-shot TV anthology programs and in two feature films, Forever Female (1953) and Fritz Lang's The Blue Gardenia (1953), but by the time the series was airing nationwide, Reeves found himself so associated with Superman and Clark Kent that it was difficult for him to find other roles.

Reeves worked tirelessly with Toni Mannix to raise money to fight myasthenia gravis. He served as national chairman for the Myasthenia Gravis Foundation in 1955. During the second season, Reeves appeared in a short film for the Treasury Department entitled Stamp Day for Superman, in which he caught the villains and told children why they should invest in government savings stamps.

After two seasons, Reeves was dissatisfied with his salary and the show's one-dimensional role. He was 40 years old and wanted to quit and move on with his career. The producers looked elsewhere for a new star.

Reeves established his own production company and conceived a TV adventure series called Port of Entry, which would be shot on location in Hawaii and Mexico. Reeves wrote the pilot script himself. However, Superman producers offered him a salary increase, and he returned to the series. He was reportedly making $5,000 (about $ in today's dollars) per week, but only while the show was in production (about eight weeks each year). As for Port of Entry, Reeves was never able to gain financing for the project, and the show was never made.

In 1957, the producers considered a theatrical film Superman and the Secret Planet. A script was commissioned from David Chantler, who had written many of the TV scripts. In 1959, however, negotiations began for a renewal of the series, with 26 episodes scheduled to go into production. By mid 1959, contracts were signed, costumes refitted, and new teleplay writers assigned. Noel Neill was quoted as saying that the cast of Superman was ready to do a new series of the still-popular show.

His good friend Bill Walsh, a producer at Disney Studios, gave Reeves a prominent role in Westward Ho the Wagons! (1956), in which Reeves wore a beard and mustache. It was to be his final feature film appearance. Attempting to showcase his versatility, Reeves sang on the Tony Bennett show in August 1956. He appeared as Superman on I Love Lucy (Episode #165, "Lucy and Superman") in 1957. Character actor Ben Welden had acted with Reeves in the Warner Bros. days and frequently guest-starred on Superman. He said, "After the I Love Lucy show, Superman was no longer a challenge to him... I know he enjoyed the role, but he used to say, 'Here I am, wasting my life.'"

Reeves, Noel Neill, Natividad Vacío, Gene LeBell, and a trio of musicians toured with a public-appearance show from 1957 onward. The first half of the show was a Superman sketch in which Reeves and Neill performed with LeBell as a villain called "Mr. Kryptonite" who captured Lois Lane. Kent then rushed offstage to return as Superman, who came to the rescue and fought with the bad guy. The second half of the show was Reeves out of costume as himself, singing and accompanying himself on the guitar. Vacio and Neill accompanied him in duets.

Reeves and Toni Mannix split in 1958 and Reeves announced his engagement to society playgirl Leonore Lemmon. Reeves was apparently scheduled to marry Lemmon on June 19 and then spend their honeymoon in Tijuana. He complained to friends, columnists, and his mother of his financial problems. The planned revival of Superman was apparently a small lifeline. Reeves had also hoped to direct a low-budget science-fiction film written by a friend from his Pasadena Playhouse days, and he had discussed the project with his first Lois Lane, Phyllis Coates, the previous year. However, Reeves and his partner failed to find financing, and the film was never made. Another Superman stage show was scheduled for July with a planned stage tour of Australia. Reeves had options for making a living, but those options apparently all involved playing Superman again—a role that he was not eager to reprise at age 45.

Jack Larson and Noel Neill both remembered Reeves as a noble Southern gentleman (even though he was from Iowa) with a sign on his dressing room door that said "Honest George, the people's friend". Reeves had been made a "Kentucky Colonel" during a publicity trip in the South, and the sign on his dressing room door was replaced with a new one that read "Honest George, also known as Col. Reeves", created by the show's prop department. A photo of a smiling Reeves and the sign appears in Gary Grossman's book about the show.

Death

Reeves died of a gunshot wound to the head in the upstairs bedroom of his home at 1579 Benedict Canyon Drive in Benedict Canyon between 1:30 and 2:00 a.m. on June 16, 1959, according to the Los Angeles Police Department report.

In contemporary news articles, Lemmon attributed Reeves' alleged suicide to depression caused by his "failed career" and inability to find more work. The report made by the Los Angeles Police states, "[Reeves was]... depressed because he couldn't get the sort of parts he wanted." Newspapers and wire-service reports quoted LAPD Sergeant V.A. Peterson as saying: "Miss Lemmon blurted, 'He's probably going to go shoot himself.' A noise was heard upstairs. She continued, 'He's opening a drawer to get the gun.' A shot was heard. 'See there—I told you so!'"'

The official story given by Lemmon to the police placed her in the living room with party guests at the time of the shooting, but hearsay statements from Fred Crane, Reeves' friend and colleague from Gone With The Wind, put Lemmon either inside or in direct proximity to Reeves' bedroom.  According to Crane (who was not present), Bill Bliss had told Millicent Trent after the shot rang out, while Bliss was having a drink, that Leonore Lemmon came downstairs and said, “Tell them I was down here, tell them I was down here!”

A number of questionable physical findings were reported by investigators and others:  No fingerprints were recovered from the gun.  No gunpowder residue was found on Reeves' hands. (Some sources contend that it may not have been looked for, as gunshot residue testing was not routinely performed in 1959). The bullet that killed Reeves was recovered from the bedroom ceiling, and the spent shell casing was found under his body. Two additional bullets were discovered embedded in the bedroom floor.  All three bullets had been fired from the weapon found at Reeves' feet, though all witnesses agreed they heard only one gunshot, and there was no sign of forced entry or other physical evidence that a second person was in the room.  Despite the unanswered questions, Reeves' death was officially ruled a suicide, based on witness statements, physical evidence at the scene, and the autopsy report.

Reeves' mother thought the ruling premature and peremptory, and retained attorney Jerry Giesler to petition for a reinvestigation of the case as a possible homicide. The findings of a second autopsy, conducted at Giesler's request, were the same as the first, except for a series of bruises of unknown origin about the head and body. A month later, having uncovered no evidence contradicting the official finding, Giesler announced that he was satisfied that the gunshot wound had been self-inflicted and withdrew.

Reeves is interred at Mountain View Cemetery and Mausoleum in Altadena, California. In 1960, Reeves was awarded a star on Hollywood's Walk of Fame on Hollywood Boulevard for his contributions to the TV industry.  In 1985, he was posthumously named one of the honorees by DC Comics in the company's 50th anniversary publication Fifty Who Made DC Great.

Controversy
Actors Alan Ladd and Gig Young were reportedly skeptical of the official determination. Reeves' friend Rory Calhoun told a reporter "No one in Hollywood believed the suicide story." In their book Hollywood Kryptonite, Sam Kashner and Nancy Schoenberger make a case for the involvement of MGM vice president and fixer Eddie Mannix. Reeves had been having an affair with his wife Toni Mannix. Others suggested that Eddie Mannix, rumored to have Mafia ties, ordered Reeves killed.

In popular culture 
The 2006 film Hollywoodland, starring Ben Affleck as Reeves and Adrien Brody as a fictional investigator loosely based on actual detective Milo Speriglio, dramatizes the investigation of Reeves' death. The film suggests three possible scenarios: accidental shooting by Lemmon, murder by an unnamed hitman under orders from Eddie Mannix, and suicide.

In June 2021, an episode of the internet series BuzzFeed Unsolved discussed the death of Reeves and possible theories.

Filmography

References

Further reading
 Daniels, Les & Kahn, Jenette, DC Comics:  Sixty Years of the World's Favorite Comic Book Heroes, Bulfinch, 1995 
 Grossman, Gary Superman: Serial to Cereal, Popular Library, 1977 
 Henderson, Jan Alan, Speeding Bullet, M. Bifulco, 1999 
 Henderson, Jan Alan & Randisi, Steve, Behind the Crimson Cape, M. Bifulco, 2005 
 Kashner, Sam & Schoenberger, Nancy Hollywood Kryptonite, St. Martin's Mass Market Paper, 1996 
 Neill, Noel & Ward, Larry, Truth, Justice and the American Way, Nicholas Lawrence Books, 2003

External links

 
 
 
 

1914 births
1959 deaths
20th-century American male actors
American adoptees
United States Army Air Forces personnel of World War II
American male film actors
American male stage actors
American male television actors
American television directors
Death conspiracy theories
First Motion Picture Unit personnel
Male actors from Iowa
Military personnel from Iowa
People from Wright County, Iowa
Suicides by firearm in California
United States Army Air Forces soldiers
1959 suicides
Unsolved deaths in the United States